Darrel "Mouse" Davis (born September 6, 1932) is a retired American football coach and former player.  A veteran coach at the high school, college, and professional levels, he last coached with Jerry Glanville at Portland State and with June Jones at the University of Hawaii at Manoa.  Davis served as the head football coach at Portland State University from 1975 to 1980, compiling a record of 42–24.  He has also been a head coach with the Denver Gold of the United States Football League (1985), the New York/New Jersey Knights of the World League of American Football (1991–1992), and the Detroit Fury of the Arena Football League (2001–2002) and the San Diego Riptide (2003) of AF2.  A native of Washington, Davis grew up in Oregon, where he started his coaching career as a high school football coach.  Davis is now widely regarded as the 'godfather' of the run and shoot offense.

Early life

Davis was born in Eastern Washington in Palouse on September 6, 1932. His family later moved to neighboring Oregon and Davis lists Independence, Oregon, as his hometown. Mouse gained his nickname from older brother Don while a freshman shortstop on the Central High School team in neighboring Monmouth, Oregon. Despite his 4'11.5" (1.58 m) stature at the time, Mouse already excelled at sports. In 1955, he graduated from the Oregon College of Education (now Western Oregon University) in neighboring Monmouth. There he played quarterback and halfback on three straight championship teams from 1952–54 under Coach Bill McArthur. Davis also played basketball and baseball at the college.

Coaching

Davis helped make the run and shoot offense famous as a coach, revolutionizing football in the 1960s and 1970s. In developing his run and shoot offense, Davis espoused the theories of Glenn "Tiger" Ellison, football coach at Middletown High School in Ohio, who wrote the book Run & Shoot Football: Offense of the Future. Davis utilized the offense in a coaching career that included 15 years at the high school level in Oregon, at the college level, and professionally in the NFL, CFL, USFL, WLAF, and Arena League.

High school

Davis spent 15 seasons coaching high school football in Oregon, culminating in a 1973 state championship at Hillsboro High School. That team went 11–1 and set school marks in seven team season offensive categories and 15 records overall. Davis also was head coach at Sunset and Milwaukie high schools in Oregon, building a combined 79–29 record among those three schools.

College
Davis then moved on to take the head coaching position at Portland State University, where he coached from 1975 to 1980. He led the PSU football program to a 42–24 record over six seasons, averaging 38 points and nearly 500 yards of offense per game. PSU led the nation in scoring three times. The unique passing game made stars out of Davis' two main quarterbacks, June Jones and Neil Lomax. In 1975, Jones, former Southern Methodist University and University of Hawaii head coach, threw for a Division II record 3,518 yards. Davis' next quarterback, Lomax, set NCAA records of 13,220 yards and 106 touchdowns in 42 games. Under Davis' direction, Portland State set 20 NCAA Division II offensive records in addition to the Vikings being named the NCAA's all-time point producers in 1980, scoring 541 points in 11 games for 49.2 points per game, along with 434.9 yards passing and 504.3 yards of total offense per game. 

Davis left Portland State to serve as offensive coordinator at UC Berkeley for the 1981 season. After Cal began the year with a 1–6 record, Davis resigned upon being told that head coach Roger Theder intended to make changes to the offensive scheme.

For the 2004–2006 seasons, Davis served as an assistant coach for Jones at Hawaii. The Warriors employed the run and shoot offense and averaged 559.2 yards of total offense, 46.9 points and produced a 10–3 record in 2006. Hawaii led the nation in passing offense (441.3), total offense, scoring offense and pass efficiency (185.95). Then in February 2007, he returned to Portland State to serve as offensive coordinator for new PSU head coach Jerry Glanville's staff. He retired at the age of 76 on June 1, 2009, but later returned to the University of Hawaii as an assistant coach on June 25, 2010.

Davis was an inaugural member of the Portland State Athletics Hall of Fame when he was inducted in 1997.

Professional

Davis has been head coach of the now-defunct USFL's Denver Gold, the WLAF's New York/New Jersey Knights, and the Arena Football League's Detroit Fury and the af2's San Diego Riptide. He was also an assistant coach with the NFL's Atlanta Falcons and Detroit Lions and with the Toronto Argonauts in the Canadian Football League.

In 1982, Davis joined the Toronto Argonauts as offensive coordinator and turned the team into a contender instantly with his pass-happy club. Led by his tandem of QBs Condredge Holloway (Tennessee) and Joe Barnes (Texas Tech). They finished the regular season with a record of (9–6–1) Davis' Argos lost in the 70th Grey Cup in 1982 to the Warren Moon-led Edmonton Eskimos to the score of 32–16.

Davis left the Argonauts prior to the 1983 season, however the team, using the offense he had installed, finished the regular season with a commanding (12–4) record and did win the 71st Grey Cup that year over the British Columbia Lions to the score of 18–17. It was their first championship in 31 years.

In 1984, Davis headed back to the US to take the offensive coordinator job with the USFL expansion Houston Gamblers. His quarterback was a rookie from the University of Miami named Jim Kelly. The "Mouseketeers" offensive unit lit up the USFL in their first year of existence passing for 5,793 yards and 45 passing touchdowns - ending their expansion season with a (13–5) record. The Gamblers' offense became the first team in pro football history to have two receivers with over 100 receptions in a single season: Richard Johnson with 115 and Ricky Sanders with 101.

In 1985, Davis took his first head coaching job at the professional level when he took the reins of the Denver Gold, bringing his run-and-shoot offense to the Mile High City. He once again had a tandem of QBs in Vince Evans and Bob Gagliano. The Gold finished the season with its first playoff berth with an (11–7) mark but lost in the first round to the Memphis Showboats.

Davis was slated to become head coach of the St. Louis Lightning of the World Indoor Football League in 1988, but the league dissolved before the season began.

1991 Davis took the head coaching job of the New York/New Jersey Knights of the WLAF. The 1991 season had Davis and the Knights go (5–5) and won the North American East Division. But they bowed out of the playoffs semifinal to the eventual champion London Monarchs. The following year saw their record improve to (6–4) and second place in the division but missed qualifying for the playoffs.

In 1993, he again joined the Toronto Argonauts as an assistant coach but the team had a disastrous season finishing 3–15 as it was an offense ill-suited to Tracy Ham's talents and Ham did not have the best weapons around him.

Influences

Despite never being a head coach at a major Division I program or NFL Team, his run and shoot offense influenced many coaches he worked with and even against.

Timmy Chang – QB at University of Hawaii and GA at SMU. OC at Jackson State University (2014–15), Emory & Henry College (2016), HC at University of Hawaii (2022-present).
Mark Duffner – HC of Holy Cross (1986–1991), HC of University of Maryland (1992–1996), and DC of Cincinnati Bengals (2001–2002)
Joe Gardi – DC of New York Jets and HC of Hofstra University (1990–2005)
Kevin Gilbride – OC of Houston Oilers (1990–1994), OC of Jacksonville Jaguars (1995–1996), HC of San Diego Chargers (1997–1998), OC of Pittsburgh Steelers (1999–2000), OC of Buffalo Bills (2002–2003), QB Coach & OC of New York Giants (2007–2013), and HC of New York Guardians (2020).
Jerry Glanville – HC of Houston Oilers, Atlanta Falcons, and Portland State University (2007–2009).
Forrest Gregg – HC Green Bay Packers (1984–1987), HC Southern Methodist University (1989–1990).
John Jenkins – OC and HC of University of Houston (1987–1994).
June Jones – OC and HC of Atlanta Falcons, HC at University of Hawaii (1999–2007), SMU (2008–2014), and HC of Houston Roughnecks.
Josh McDaniels – HC Las Vegas Raiders (2022-current), OC New England Patriots (2005–2008, 2012–2021), HC Denver Broncos (2009–2010), OC St. Louis Rams (2011)
Chris Palmer – WR Houston Oilers (1990–1992), WR/QB New England Patriots (1993–1996), OC of Jacksonville Jaguars (1997–1998), HC of Cleveland Browns (1999–2000), OC Houston Texans (2002–2005), and OC of Tennessee Titans (2011–2012)
Jack Pardee – HC University of Houston (1987–1989) and Houston Oilers (1990–1994)
Jason Phillips – co–OC at University of Houston (2008–2010) and co–OC at SMU (2012–15).
Nick Rolovich – OC/QB at University of Hawaii (2010–2011), University of Nevada (2012–2015), and HC at University of Hawaii (2016–19) and Washington State University (2020–present).
Tony Sparano – OC at Boston University (1989–1993), HC of Miami Dolphins (2008–2011), and OC of New York Jets (2012)
Mike Sullivan – WR & QB Coach of New York Giants (2004–2011) and OC of Tampa Bay Buccaneers (2012–2013)
Charlie Weis – OC New York Jets (1997–1999), OC New England Patriots (2000–2004), HC Notre Dame Fighting Irish (2005–2009), OC Kansas City Chiefs (2010), OC University of Florida (2011), HC University of Kansas (2012–2014)

Head coaching record

College

References

External links
 Hawaii profile

1932 births
Living people
American football halfbacks
American football quarterbacks
Atlanta Falcons coaches
California Golden Bears football coaches
Detroit Fury coaches
Detroit Lions coaches
Hawaii Rainbow Warriors football coaches
High school football coaches in Oregon
NFL Europe (WLAF) coaches
People from Independence, Oregon
People from Palouse, Washington
Players of American football from Oregon
Portland State Vikings football coaches
Sportspeople from Hillsboro, Oregon
Toronto Argonauts coaches
United States Football League coaches
Western Oregon Wolves football players